New Zealand made its Winter Paralympic Games début in the 1980 Winter Paralympics in Geilo, Norway. The country was represented by three athletes, all in alpine skiing. They did not win any medals.

Alpine skiing 

Peter Baddeley, Ed Nichols and Craig Philip represented New Zealand in alpine skiing.

See also
New Zealand at the Paralympics
New Zealand at the 1980 Winter Olympics

Notes and references

External links
International Paralympic Committee official website

Nations at the 1980 Winter Paralympics
1980
Winter Paralympics